Plata dulce (meaning "easy money", literally "sweet money") is an Argentine comedy drama-historic film. It was released on 8 July 1982 and directed by Fernando Ayala, starring Federico Luppi, Julio de Grazia and Gianni Lunadei. It received a Cóndor de Plata award for best film in 1983.

During this historic period in Argentina, many labour rights were suspended and industrial production fell to extremely low levels, while banks started rising and external debt grew practically exponentially. The result of these economic politics (which aimed for easy money) was one of the biggest disasters in the country's history, producing a large loss of its industry and bringing large part of the population into poverty.

Plot
Two businessmen dedicated to manufacturing and selling bathroom cabinets struggle to keep their factory running through a series of deep deindustrialization politics being pushed by the country's National Reorganization Process. One of them, Carlos Bonifatti, gets a chance at working in a bank and decides to stop manufacturing cabinets and dedicate fully to financial businesses which seem to be rising. The other partner, Rubén Molinuevo, sticks to the factory work. At the beginning the choice seems good for Bonifatti, who highly improves his living standards, but shortly after the tables will turn for both of them.

Cast
Federico Luppi: Carlos Bonifatti
Julio De Grazia: Rubén Molinuevo
Gianni Lunadei: Arteche
Nora Cullen
Adriana Aizemberg
Flora Steinberg
Alberto Segado
Hernán Gené
Marina Skell: Patricia

Ricardo Hamlin
Eduardo Alcoba
Rubén Cosenza
Max Berliner

Awards
Premios Cóndor de Plata 1983: Mejor película

References

External links

Ficha de Plata dulce Cine Nacional

1982 films
Argentine comedy-drama films
1982 comedy-drama films
1980s Spanish-language films
Films directed by Fernando Ayala
1980s Argentine films